Kaas or KAAS may refer to:
 Kaas (noble family)
 Kaas (surname)
 Taylor County Airport (Kentucky)
 KAAS-LP, a low-power television station (channel 31) licensed to Garden City, Kansas, United States
 KAAS-TV, a television station (channel 17 virtual/digital) licensed to Salina, Kansas, United States
 Kaas or Kås, a town in Jammerbugt Municipality, Denmark
 Knowledge as a service
Kaas or KAAS can also be seen as a god in certain countries.

See also
Kas (disambiguation)
Kash (disambiguation)